The Singapore women's national under-16 basketball team is a national basketball team of Singapore, governed by the Basketball Association of Singapore.
It represents the country in international under-16 (under age 16) women's basketball competitions.

See also
Singapore women's national basketball team
Singapore women's national under-18 basketball team
Singapore men's national under-16 basketball team

References

External links
Archived records of Singapore team participations

under17
Women's national under-16 basketball teams